A toe is a digit of the foot of a human or animal.

Toe or TOE may also refer to:

Geography
 North Toe River, a large stream in the North Carolina High Country, in the United States
 South Toe River, a stream in Yancy County in Western North Carolina, United States
 The Toe, a landmark on Nelson Island in the South Shetland Islands

Arts, entertainment, and media
 Toe (band), a Japanese post-rock band
 T.O.E., former name of the band Cauterize (band)
 Tales of Eternia

Computing and technology
 TOE, the Specific Area Message Encoding code for a 9-1-1 Telephone Outage Emergency
 TCP Offload Engine, a technology used by Ethernet Network Interface Cards

Science and mathematics
 Toé, a common South American name for Datura and related plants
 Glacier terminus, also known as its toe
 Periodic table (Table of Elements, or TOE), periodic table of the chemical elements
 Theory of everything (or TOE), a sought-after physics theory to fully explain and link together all known physical phenomena
 Theory of Evolution (or TOE)
 Transesophageal echocardiogram (or TOE), a medical investigation using an ultrasound probe
 Truncated octahedron, a uniform polyhedron

Other uses
 Toe (name)
 Toe (automotive) (or Toe-in), the angle that each wheel makes with the longitudinal axis of a vehicle
 Table of Organization and Equipment (TOE or TO&E)
 Target of Evaluation (or TOE), the system to be evaluated in a Common Criteria evaluation
 Terms of employment (or TOE)
 Texas, Oklahoma and Eastern Railroad (or TOE)
 Toe of a characteristic curve (photography), the low end of the response curve
 Tonne of oil equivalent (or TOE)

See also 
 Tic Tac Toe (band), a band
 Tic-tac-toe, ta e game
 Toes (disambiguation)
Ton (disambiguation)
 Tow (disambiguation)